Birma is a rural locality (a selo) in Lermontovsky Selsoviet of Seryshevsky District, Amur Oblast, Russia. The population was 45 as of 2018. There are 2 streets.

Geography 
Birma is located on the Birma River, 54 km northeast of Seryshevo (the district's administrative centre) by road. Alexeyevka is the nearest rural locality.

References 

Rural localities in Seryshevsky District